Dativali is a railway station on the Vasai Road–Diva–Panvel–Roha route of the Central Line, of the Mumbai Suburban Railway network.

Railway stations in Thane district
Mumbai Suburban Railway stations
Mumbai CR railway division
Diva-Panvel rail line